Zhongdong (Zhuang: Cunghdungh Cin) is a town under the administration of Fusui County in southern Guangxi Zhuang Autonomous Region, China. , it had an area of  populated by 38,000 people residing in 1 residential communities and 14 villages.

Administrative divisions
There are 1 residential communities and 14 villages:

Residential communities:
 Zhongdong(中东社区)

Villages:
 Xinling(新灵村), Pingshan(瓶山村),  Jiuxian(旧县村), Fengpo(丰坡村), Jiuhe(九和村), Sitong(思同村), Xinlong(新隆村), Baiyu, (百域村) Shangyu(上余村), Sanshao(三哨村), Dongshao(东哨村), Linhe(淋和村), Sixin(四新村), Weijiu(维旧村)

See also
List of township-level divisions of Guangxi

References

External links
  Zhongdong Town/Official website of  Zhongdong

Towns of Guangxi
Fusui County